Dillingham City School District is a school district headquartered in Dillingham, Alaska. The district consists of Dillingham Elementary School (Grades K-5), and Dillingham Middle/High School (Grades 6–12).

Athletics and Activities 
The DHS Wolverines compete in the Alaska School Activities Association Region I.

References

External links 
 Dillingham City School District

School districts in Alaska
Education in Unorganized Borough, Alaska
Dillingham Census Area, Alaska